{{DISPLAYTITLE:C12H22O6}}
The molecular formula C12H22O6 (molar mass: 262.3 g/mol) refers to a number of compounds, including:

 Dibutyl tartrate
 Etoglucid

Molecular formulas